The following is a list of the aircraft operated by the Egyptian Air Force throughout its history. Coloured cells denote types that are still in active service.

Fixed Wing

Helicopters

References 

Egyptian Air Force
Egypt
Egyptian military aircraft
aircraft of the Egyptian Air Force